The swimming championships of Season 76 of the University Athletic Association of the Philippines were held at the Trace Aquatic Center, Los Baños, Laguna with the University of the Philippines (UP) as event host, from September 19 to 22, 2013. Ateneo de Manila University was the defending men's and boys division champions. The reigning women's and girls titlists were UP and University of the East (UE), respectively.

At the end of the four-day competition, UP clinched a double championship in the seniors division: the 17th title in the men's and a five-peat for the women's. Ateneo won their ninth straight UAAP crown, while UE achieved a three-peat plum. Further, there was a total of 34 new UAAP records that were established: 7 in the men's division, 12 in women's, 10 in boys', and 5 in girls'.

Point System
Ranking is determined by a point system, similar to that of the overall championship. The points given are based on the swimmer's/team's finish in the finals of an event, which include only the top eight finishers from the preliminaries. The gold medalist(s) receive 15 points, silver gets 12, bronze has 10. The following points are given in order of subsequent finish: 8, 6, 4, 2, and 1.

Medal Table and Rankings

Men's tournament

Team standings
 Season host in boldface.

Women's tournament

Team standings
 Season host in boldface.

Boys' tournament

Team standings

Girls' tournament

Team standings

Medal winners

Men's division

References

2013 in Philippine sport